613 Ginevra is a mid-sized asteroid orbiting the Sun.

References

External links
 
 

Background asteroids
Ginevra
Ginevra
P-type asteroids (Tholen)
19061011